Lacrosse is a double album by John Zorn. It is made up of different takes of his early game piece, "Lacrosse". The first disc is from WKCR in June 1978 where Mark Abbott, Polly Bradfield, Eugene Chadbourne, and LaDonna Smith and Zorn recorded six different takes. Takes 3, 4 and 6 were originally released on the Parachute Records double LP School (1978). The second disc is the original recording of "Lacrosse" which was made by Eugene Chadbourne, Henry Kaiser, Bruce Ackley, and Zorn (dubbed "Twins") in San Francisco, California in June 1977.

Lacrosse was originally released in 1997 as a part of The Parachute Years box set and then released on its own in 2000.

Reception
The Allmusic review by Joslyn Layne awarded the album two stars, stating "The release consists of a number of takes, or outcomes, of two different groups of musicians performing this structure for improvisation."

Track listing
Disc one
"Take 3" – 23:06
"Take 4" – 19:06
"Take 6" – 6:20
"Take 1" – 7:01
"Take 2" – 8:08
"Take 5" – 8:16
Disc two
"Twins Version" – 29:56
All compositions by John Zorn.
Disc two recorded June 1977 in San Francisco, Disc one recorded at WKCR, New York on June 10, 1978

Personnel
John Zorn – alto saxophone,  clarinet, soprano saxophone, liner notes
Mark Abbott – electronics
Bruce Ackley – soprano saxophone, liner notes
Allen Asaf – engineer
Polly Bradfield – violin, viola, electric violin
Eugene Chadbourne – acoustic guitar, dobro, electric guitar, twelve string guitar, liner notes, tiple, six string bass, twelve string acoustic guitar
Henry Kaiser – electric guitar
LaDonna Smith – violin, viola
Davey Williams – banjo, electric guitar, hollow body guitar

References

John Zorn live albums
2000 live albums
Tzadik Records live albums
Albums recorded at WKCR-FM